Events in the year 1885 in India.

Incumbents
 Empress of India – Queen Victoria
 Viceroy of India – The Earl of Dufferin

Events
 National income - 3,991 million
 24 June – Lord Randolph Churchill becomes Secretary of State for India.
 28 December – 72 Indian lawyers, academics and journalists gather at Gokuldas Tejpal Sanskrit College in Bombay to form the Congress Party.
First President of Indian National Congress – W. C. Banerjee; First Secretary of Indian National Congress – A. O. Hume; Dadabbhai Naoroji gave the name Indian National Congress

Law
Indian Telegraph Act
Land Acquisition (Mines) Act
East India Unclaimed Stock Act (British statute)
East India Loan Act (British statute)
Indian Army Pension Deficiency Act (British statute)
Evidence By Commission Act (British statute)

Births
14 February – Syed Zafarul Hasan, Muslim philosopher (died 1949).

References

 
India
Years of the 19th century in India